Radio Music Society is the fourth studio album by Esperanza Spalding, which was released through the record label Heads Up International on March 20, 2012. The album earned Spalding Grammy Awards for Best Jazz Vocal Album and Best Instrumental Arrangement Accompanying Vocalist(s) for the track, "City of Roses".

Critical reception

Radio Music Society was well received by music critics. At Metacritic, which assigns a normalised rating out of 100 to reviews from mainstream critics, the album received an average score of 74, based on 15 reviews, which indicates "generally favorable reviews". John Bungey of The Times noted the album's "journey through soul, gospel, balladry and big-band swing", and complimented Spalding's "light, airy voice". He wrote in conclusion: "For those who have hitherto found her considerable abilities easier to admire than enjoy, this is the most convincing display yet". A review in the monthly Kulturspiegel extra of the German Spiegel magazine noted that the poppy arrangements of the songs might help the album to become successful beyond the jazz genre. Jeff Artist of Okayplayer wrote "With her new companion LP, Radio Music Society, the young virtuoso branches out sonically, injecting her jazz roots with some modern soul and pop juice, maybe even inspiring the Bieber faithful to check in on what all the fuss is about... At just 11 tracks, this record flexes serious range, but what’s even more impressive is that it rarely sounds overextended".

Commercial performance
In the United States, Radio Music Society became Spalding's first Top 10 album. It debuted at number 10 on the Billboard 200 chart and number one on the Top Jazz Albums chart with first week sales of 25,000 copies. The album has sold 135,000 copies in the US as of January 2016.

Track listing

Personnel

Production 
Esperanza Spalding: producer
Q-Tip: executive producer, co-producer (3, 11)
Dave Love: associate executive producer
Terri Lyne Carrington: additional production
Dan Hallas: local production
Zulema Mejias: local production

Musicians 

Esperanza Spalding: vocals, electric and acoustic bass
Leo Genovese: piano, Rhodes electric piano, keyboards (1–3, 6, 8–12), guembri (9)
Daniel Blake: saxophones, flute (1–3, 8–10)
Darren Barrett: trumpet (1–3, 9, 10, 12)
Jeff Galindo: trombone (1, 3, 8, 10, 12)
Terri Lyne Carrington: drums (1–3, 5, 9, 11)
Gretchen Parlato: background vocals, spoken word (1, 6, 10)
Becca Stevens, Justin Brown: background vocals (1, 6)
Alan Hampton, Chris Turner: background vocals (1)
Jamie Haddad: percussion (1)
Jef Lee Johnson: guitar (2, 9)
Olivia Deprado: violin (2)
Jody Redhage: cello (2)
James Weidman: organ (4)
Algebra Blessett: vocals (5)
Savannah Children's Choir: choral voices (5)
Lionel Loueke: guitar, voice (5)
Raymond Angry: organ (5)
Tivon Penicott:tenor saxophone(5)
Igmar Thomas, Corey King: trumpet (5)
Joe Lovano: tenor saxophone (6, 13)
Ricardo Vogt: guitar (6, 8, 10)
Lyndon Rochelle: drums (6)
Janice Scroggins: piano (7)
Billy Hart: drums (7)
Jack DeJohnette: drums (8, 10, 12)
Lalah Hathaway: vocals (9)
Raydar Ellis: spoken word, sounds (10)
Leni Stern: background vocals (10)
Anthony Diamond: saxophone (11)
Q-Tip: vocals, glockenspiel (11)
Gilad Hekselman: guitar (12)
American Music Program big band (1, 7, 11)
arranged and conducted by Thara Memory 
Kama Bell: clarinet
Renato Caranto, John Carey, Andrew Olsen, Sam Seacrest, Kyle Zimmerman: alto saxophone
Hayden Conrad, Nicole Glover, Aaron Reihs, Adam Reihs: tenor saxophone
Stanley Matabane: tenor and alto saxophone
Jeff Rathbone: baritone saxophone
Kiran Bosely, Noah Conrad, Noah Hocker, Benjamin C. McDonald, Tree Palmedo, Benjamin Seacrest: trumpet
Stan Bock, Dan Brewster, Ian Garner, Javier Nero, Ashton Summers, Matt Warming: trombone
Jerry Stalnaker: bass trombone

Charts

Singles

References

2012 albums
Esperanza Spalding albums
Heads Up International albums
Grammy Award for Best Jazz Vocal Album
Albums produced by Q-Tip (musician)